Abe Burrows (born Abram Solman Borowitz; December 18, 1910 – May 17, 1985) was an American humorist, author, and director for radio and the stage. He won a Tony Award and was selected for two Pulitzer Prizes, only one of which was awarded.

Early years
 
Born Abram Solman Borowitz in New York City, Burrows graduated from New Utrecht High School in Brooklyn and later attended both City College and New York University. He began working as a runner on Wall Street while at NYU, and he also worked in an accounting firm. After he met Frank Galen in 1938, the two wrote and sold jokes to an impressionist who appeared on Rudy Vallée's radio program.

Career

Radio
His radio career gained strength when he collaborated with Ed Gardner, the writer and star of radio's legendary Duffy's Tavern. The two created the successful series after Gardner's character, Archie, premiered on This Is New York, an earlier radio program. Burrows was made the show's head writer in 1941, and he credited his experience with inventing the Runyonesque street characters he fashioned for Guys and Dolls. "The people on that show," Burrows once said about Duffy's Tavern, "were New York mugs, nice mugs, sweet mugs, and like (Damon) Runyon's mugs they all talked like ladies and gentlemen. That's how we treated the characters in Guys and Dolls." 

Burrows also wrote for Danny Kaye's short-lived mid-1940s radio comedy show, helping head writer Goodman Ace fashion material for Kaye and co-stars Eve Arden and Lionel Stander. He quit Duffy's Tavern in 1945 to work at Paramount Pictures but soon returned to radio. As a guest on Here's Morgan in 1947, Burrows performed "I'll Bet You're Sorry Now, Tokyo Rose, Sorry for What You Done." 

Meanwhile, he became a popular guest on the Hollywood party circuit, performing his own satirical songs ("Darling Why Shouldn't You Look Well Fed, ‘Cause You Ate Up a Hunka My Heart?" and "The Girl with the Three Blue Eyes"). Such informal performances led to a nightclub act and regular appearances as a performer on CBS radio programs, and to his eventually hosting his own radio program on CBS Radio from 1947 to 1949.

As he recalled years later, his show came about while he was scripting a radio show for Joan Davis when George Jessel asked him, "When the hell are you gonna become a professional?" Burrows continued as Davis' head writer while doing his own show. Mixing comic patter ("I guess I could tell you exactly what I look like, but I think that's a lousy thing to say about a guy") with his clever comic songs, The Abe Burrows Show was popular with listeners and critics but not with its sponsor, Lambert Pharmaceutical, then the makers of Listerine mouthwash, but promoting a Listerine toothpaste on the show. Lambert, according to Burrows, complained that the show wasn't selling much of the toothpaste. "It seems that my fans were being naughty," he wrote. "While they were laughing at my jokes, they were sneering at my toothpaste." 

The New York Public Library holds the Abe Burrows papers, which include complete runs of both The Abe Burrows Show (CBS, 1947–48) and Breakfast with Burrows (CBS, 1949), as well as appearances on other radio shows. 

Both of Burrows' radio shows originated from KNX, CBS's Los Angeles affiliate, whose program director Ernie Martin encouraged Burrows, who had done some film work, to think about writing plays. "I told him I felt my funny stuff was okay for radio, but I didn't think people would pay theater prices to hear it," Burrows recalled.

Broadway
Burrows credited his success in the theatre to his work under the theatre legend George S. Kaufman. In the Kaufman biography by Howard Teichmann, Burrows is quoted as saying that what he said (as a director, to his cast) was what he heard Kaufman say in their collaboration on Guys and Dolls.

Eventually, Burrows wrote, doctored, or directed such shows as Make a Wish, Two on the Aisle, Three Wishes for Jamie, Say, Darling, Guys and Dolls, How to Succeed in Business Without Really Trying, Cactus Flower, Four on a Garden, Can-Can, Silk Stockings, Breakfast at Tiffany's, Good News (1974 revival), and many others. With his collaborator Frank Loesser, Burrows won a Pulitzer Prize for How to Succeed in Business Without Really Trying.

Burrows wrote and directed the first Broadway musical version of a Jane Austen novel, First Impressions, a rewriting of Pride and Prejudice. The show, which ran for 84 performances in 1959, is widely described as a flop. Burrows thought that critics panned the show because they wondered why a comedy guy was taking on "tired period drama," but the script shows some unusual choices. Burrows had his version of heroine Elizabeth Bennet decide to join forces with her marriage-hungry mother in order to snag hero Mr. Darcy.

Burrows also became a famous script doctor, enough so that the desperate remark of a producer, "Get me Abe Burrows!", remained for many years Broadway shorthand for a script that needed repair. Yet Burrows himself downplayed that role in his memoir, and discussed his fixing of Make a Wish:
I have... performed surgery on a few shows, but not as many as I'm given credit for. I've been involved in 19 theatrical productions, plus their road company offshoots. Only a few of these have been surgical patients. And I don't usually talk about them. I feel that a fellow who doctors a show should have the same ethical approach that a plastic surgeon has. It wouldn't be very nice if a plastic surgeon were walking down the street with you, and a beautiful girl approached. And you say, "What a beautiful girl." And the plastic surgeon says, "She was a patient of mine. You should have seen her before I fixed her nose." Doctoring seldom cures a show. The sickness usually starts at the moment the author puts the first sheet of paper in his typewriter. All the redirecting and recasting can never help much if the basic story is wrong.

Guys and Dolls was apparently selected as the winner for the Pulitzer Prize in Letters. However, because of Burrows' troubles with the House Un-American Activities Committee (HUAC), no Pulitzer for Letters was awarded in 1951, as the Trustees of Columbia University had the right of veto.

Burrows wrote the screenplay for The Solid Gold Cadillac in 1956 as well as produced a television series Abe Burrows' Almanac (1950) and The Big Party (1959).

In 1980, he published his memoir, Honest, Abe: Is There Really No Business Like Show Business?, in which he recalled the meat of his career. He mentored several comedy writers,  including future M*A*S*H writer Larry Gelbart (who was once a Duffy's Tavern writer), Nat Hiken, Dick Martin and Woody Allen, the latter a distant cousin of Burrows.

Television

Over three decades, Burrows appeared as a panelist on programs such as This Is Show Business, What's My Line?, To Tell the Truth, and Match Game 77, all on CBS. He also appeared on Call My Bluff on NBC. On October 27, 1952, he guest-starred on CBS's Faye Emerson's Wonderful Town when the television series visited The Bronx.

Recordings 
Burrows recorded albums for Decca and Columbia.

The Girl with the Three Blue Eyes and other topical type songs (1947, Decca A-607), 10-inch 78rpm, reissued on 10-inch LP (1950, Decca DL 5288)
Abe Burrows Sings? (1950, Columbia), with orchestra under the direction of Milton DeLugg, 10-inch LP
Fun House! (1959, Harmony Records), various artists, includes Boulder Dam by Burrows

Personal life
 
He was married twice.  His son, James Burrows, became an influential television director whose credits have included The Mary Tyler Moore Show and Cheers. His daughter, Laurie Burrows Grad, is the author of four cookbooks and host of her own cooking show on The Learning Channel.

Abe Burrows died from Alzheimer's disease in his native New York City.

References

Further reading
Burrows, Abe. Honest Abe: Is There Really No Business Like Show Business? Boston: Atlantic-Little, Brown, 1980. 
Sies, Luther F. Encyclopedia of American Radio, 1920-1960.  Jefferson, North Carolina: McFarland, 2000.

External links

 
 
 
Abe Burrows papers, 1904-1993, held by the Billy Rose Theatre Division, New York Public Library for the Performing Arts
Abe Burrows scores, 1947-1949, held by the Billy Rose Theatre Division, New York Public Library for the Performing Arts
Abe Burrows collection of sound recordings, at the New York Public Library for the Performing Arts
Duffy's Tavern: "Leave Us Face It" (14 December 1943) with guest star: Dinah Shore
The Abe Burrows Show, four surviving episodes
Abe Burrows speaking at an ASCAP seminar on the musical theater as broadcast by WNYC on October 21, 1962.

Jewish American writers
Pulitzer Prize for Drama winners
Tony Award winners
Writers from Brooklyn
Deaths from Alzheimer's disease
Deaths from dementia in New York (state)
1910 births
1985 deaths
20th-century American dramatists and playwrights
American male dramatists and playwrights
20th-century American male writers
Broadway theatre directors
New Utrecht High School alumni
20th-century American Jews